The First Presbyterian Church in Hays, Kansas is a historic stone Presbyterian church building at 100 W. 7th Street.  It was built in 1879 and added to the National Register in 1973.

The congregation was organized in 1873, and may have been the first in western Kansas.

References

External links
Official First Presbyterian website

Presbyterian churches in Kansas
Churches on the National Register of Historic Places in Kansas
Churches in Ellis County, Kansas
National Register of Historic Places in Ellis County, Kansas
Buildings and structures in Hays, Kansas